Plaumannimyia eugenia is a species of fruit fly in the genus Plaumannimyia of the family Tephritidae.

Distribution
Mexico, Guatemala.

References

Tephritinae
Insects described in 1900
Diptera of North America